Senegal, participated at the 2015 All-Africa Games held in the city of Brazzaville, Republic of the Congo. It participated with 287 athletes in 20 sports.

Medal summary

Medal table

Paralympic Sports

Multiple medallists

Athletics

Badminton

Basketball

Women

Group B

Knockout stage
All matches were played at the: Gymnase Makélékélé, in Brazzaville

Quarter-finals

Semifinals

Bronze medal match

Beach volleyball

Boxing

Cycling

Fencing

Football

Squad

Men

Group B

Semifinals

Gold medal match

Gymnastics

Judo

Karate

Swimming

Table tennis

Tennis

Senegal entered two tennis players into the African Games.

Men

Volleyball

Women

Group A

|}

|}

Weightlifting

Wrestling

References

Nations at the 2015 African Games